Thore Aksel Nistad (born 23 May 1949, in Oslo) is a Norwegian politician for the Progress Party.

He was elected to the Norwegian Parliament from Oppland in 1997, and has been re-elected on two occasions.

Nistad was a member of Gjøvik municipality council from 1991 to 2003 and 2005 to 2007. From 1983 to 1999 he was also involved in Oppland county council.

References

1949 births
Living people
Politicians from Gjøvik
Progress Party (Norway) politicians
Members of the Storting
21st-century Norwegian politicians
20th-century Norwegian politicians